The men's 52 kg boxing event at the 2015 European Games in Baku took place between 16 and 26 June at the Baku Crystal Hall.

Results

References

External links

Men 52